The 1977–78 season was the 98th season of competitive football in England.

Diary of the season

11 July 1977: Don Revie resigns as manager of the England national football team after three years in charge.

12 July 1977: Barely 24 hours after quitting as England manager, Don Revie accepts a four-year contract worth £340,000 to take charge of the United Arab Emirates national team, making him the highest-paid football manager in the world.

14 July 1977: Dave Sexton steps down at Queens Park Rangers to take over as manager of Manchester United, where Tommy Docherty was sacked ten days ago. Frank Sibley succeeds Sexton at QPR, becoming the youngest  manager in the history of the top-flight.

17 July 1977: Fulham are banned from the transfer market due to a reported £700,000 debt.

25 July 1977: Manchester City pay £300,000 for Southampton striker Mick Channon, who signs a six-year contract at Maine Road.

3 August 1977: Derby County sign a sponsorship deal with Swedish carmaker Saab, who supply all of the club's players with a Saab car.

5 August 1977: The Football League backs The Football Association's ban on sponsors advertising themselves on player's strips. However, non-league clubs are permitted to show sponsor's names on their players' shirts.

10 August 1977: Kenny Dalglish becomes the most expensive player to be signed by a British club when he joins Liverpool in a £440,000 move from Celtic. He takes over from Kevin Keegan, who recently joined Hamburg to become the most expensive player in Europe, as Liverpool's main striker.

11 August 1977: Pat Jennings ends 13 years at Tottenham Hotspur and signs for Arsenal in a £45,000 deal.

15 August 1977: Ron Greenwood, general manager of West Ham United and team manager until 1974, accepts an offer to become temporary manager of the England national team, initially for three matches only.

19 August 1977: Walsall hooligan Edward Beech, 19, receives a three-year prison sentence for kicking a policeman in the face at a game at Fellows Park last season.

20 August 1977: Champions Liverpool open the First Division season with 1–1 draw away to Middlesbrough. Promoted Nottingham Forest win 3–1 at Everton.

27 August 1977: Brian Clough sinks his old charges as his Nottingham Forest side beat rivals Derby County 3–0.

31 August 1977: Nottingham Forest top the First Division table at the end of the first month of the season after winning their first three matches. Birmingham City and West Ham United have both lost their first three games.

8 September 1977: Sir Alf Ramsey makes a shock return to management, taking over at the First Division's basement side Birmingham City following the resignation of Willie Bell. However, he also announces that this role will only be temporary, and that he will step down by, at the latest, the end of the season.

13–14 September 1977: In the Anglo-Scottish Cup quarter-final first legs, Fulham versus St Mirren and finishes 1–1, as does Notts County's visit to Motherwell. Bristol City and Blackburn Rovers are beaten, by Partick Thistle and Hibs respectively.

19 September 1977: Tommy Docherty makes a swift return to management at Derby County, who demote Colin Murphy back to his previous role as reserve team manager.

27–29 September 1977: English clubs make up two of the four Anglo-Scottish Cup semi-final contingent, as Notts County and Bristol City progress. Blackburn and Fulham are eliminated, the latter after two late goals saw St Mirren win the match 5–3 on the night and 6–4 on aggregate.

30 September 1977: Manchester City, Nottingham Forest and Liverpool are level on points at the top of the League at the end of September. Newcastle United and winless Derby County fill the bottom two places.

15 October 1977: Bottom-of-the-table Newcastle United lose their tenth consecutive League match, a club record.

22 October 1977: Tottenham Hotspur's challenge for an immediate return to the First Division is boosted by a 9-0 home win over Bristol Rovers, in which debutant striker Colin Lee scores four goals and his partner Ian Moores scores a hat-trick.

31 October 1977: Nottingham Forest continue to set the pace at the end of October. They are now four points ahead of Liverpool. Newcastle United remain bottom, and are joined by Leicester City and Bristol City in the relegation zone.

9 November 1977: Newcastle United sack manager Richard Dinnis, as a result of the club's appalling form combined with Dinnis publicly criticising chairman Lord Westwood's running of the club.

16 November 1977: England beat Italy 2–0 at Wembley Stadium in their final World Cup qualifying game, but will still fail to qualify for next summer's final tournament, if Italy win against Luxembourg.

18 November 1977: Bill McGarry is appointed as Newcastle United's new manager, and shakes the club up by immediately announcing that several of the players who threatened strike action to secure the appointment of previous manager Richard Dinnis earlier in the year, in particular Alan Gowling, Tommy Craig and team captain Geoff Nulty, are transfer-listed with immediate effect and will not play for the club again.

19 November 1977: Leeds United beat Nottingham Forest 1–0.

30 November 1977: After picking up just four points from four matches this month, Nottingham Forest have had their lead at the top of the table cut to just one point by Everton, with West Bromwich Albion and Coventry City a further two points behind. At the bottom, Newcastle United are already seven points from safety; Leicester City and West Ham United complete the bottom three.

3 December 1977: Italy's win against Luxembourg eliminates England from the World Cup Qualifying.

6 December 1977: Liverpool win the European Super Cup by completing a 7–1 aggregate win over Hamburg; they win the second leg 6–0 after drawing 1–1 in the first leg.

12 December 1977: Ron Greenwood is appointed England manager on a four-and-a-half year contract despite their failure to qualify for the 1978 World Cup.

17 December 1977: Nottingham Forest shock everyone by beating Manchester United 4-0 at Old Trafford, shaking off the 'caretaker leaders' tag applied to them by members of the media, who firmly believed Liverpool would lead the way at this stage.

22 December 1977: West Bromwich Albion manager Ronnie Allen resigns, despite the club being fourth in the First Division.

26 December 1977: Manchester United thrash high-flying Everton 6–2.

27 December 1977: The highest scoring game of the day is at Highfield Road, as Coventry beat Norwich 5–4. Everton lose for the second time in two days, this time by Leeds United at a sold-out Elland Road. Arsenal go level on point with the Toffees by registering their fifth consecutive away win, with victory at West Bromwich Albion.

31 December 1977: Nottingham Forest end a remarkable year with a clear five-point lead over Everton at the top of the First Division. Newcastle United have overtaken Leicester City at the bottom, and Queens Park Rangers have slipped into the relegation zone just two seasons after finishing second in the League.

7 January 1978: FA Cup third round day sees Leeds fans invade the Elland Road pitch, reportedly to get their match with Manchester City called off after the Yorkshire club go 2-0 down; City custodian Joe Corrigan is hauled to the ground. Elsewhere, reigning Cup winners Manchester United draw with Third Division club Carlisle United, Blyth Spartans win the battle of the non-leaguers by beating Enfield, Bristol City and Wrexham share eight in the Anglo-Welsh derby, Tilbury's FA Cup run– their best–is ended by Stoke City, and Chelsea beat Liverpool 4–2.

10 January 1978: Liverpool pay a British record £352,000 for Middlesbrough midfielder Graeme Souness.

12 January 1978: Cambridge United manager Ron Atkinson is appointed as manager of West Bromwich Albion. Cambridge, who are second in the Third Division, announce that Atkinson's assistant, John Docherty will succeed him as manager.

28 January 1978: First Division strugglers Leicester City are knocked out of the FA Cup by Third Division Walsall in one of the shocks of this season's competition. Holders Manchester United are held to a 1–1 draw at home by West Bromwich Albion.

31 January 1978: Nottingham Forest's title bid shows no signs of faltering, and they are six points ahead of Manchester City, Everton and Liverpool at the end of January.

1 February 1978: West Bromwich Albion beat Manchester United 3–2 in an FA Cup fourth round replay. John Toshack, 29 next month, becomes the youngest manager in the Football League when he ends eight years on Liverpool's playing staff to become player-manager of Swansea City.

6 February 1978: Blyth Spartans, of the Northern Premier League, defeat Stoke City of the Football League Second Division 3–2 at the Victoria Ground to become the first non-league club to reach the fifth round of the FA Cup in 29 years. In another surprise result, Newcastle United are beaten 4–1 in a replay by Wrexham.

9 February 1978: Manchester United pay a national record fee of £495,000 for Leeds United defender Gordon McQueen.

18 February 1978: Blyth Spartans concede a last-minute equaliser to Wrexham in a 1–1 draw at the Racecourse Ground that denies them a place in the FA Cup quarter-finals.

22 February 1978: Ron Greenwood's first match as permanent England manager ends in a 2–1 defeat to West Germany in Munich.

27 February 1978: Wrexham finally end the FA Cup run of Blyth Spartans by beating them 2–1 in a replay at St James' Park.

6 March 1978: Birmingham City appoint Blackburn Rovers manager Jim Smith as their new manager, as Sir Alf Ramsay announces his final retirement from football management.

8 March 1978: Liverpool suffer their fourth defeat in five League games, 4–2 at Derby County, and now trail Nottingham Forest by nine points having played a game more.

11 March 1978: West Bromwich Albion beat Nottingham Forest 2–0 at The Hawthorns in the FA Cup sixth round. Arsenal beat Wrexham 3–2, and Ipswich Town win 6–1 at Millwall in a game interrupted by rioting spectators.

14 March 1978: Second Division Orient take the last FA Cup semi-final spot with a 2–1 replay victory over Middlesbrough.

18 March 1978: The League Cup final ends in a goalless draw between Liverpool and Nottingham Forest.

22 March 1978: Nottingham Forest end their 19-year wait for a major trophy by defeating Liverpool 1–0 in the Football League Cup final replay at Old Trafford, thanks to a penalty by John Robertson.

23 March 1978: Hartlepool United defender Dave Wiggett, 20, is killed in a car crash.

31 March 1978: Nottingham Forest remain in a commanding position at the top of the First Division, four points ahead of Everton with two games in hand. At the bottom, Leicester City and Newcastle United have been cut adrift, and Queens Park Rangers are one point behind West Ham United in the battle to avoid the remaining relegation spot.

5 April 1978: Leicester City sack manager Frank McLintock, following a defeat to Liverpool which has all but confirmed their relegation barring a highly improbable set of results.

8 April 1978: Arsenal and Ipswich Town reach the FA Cup final after semi-final victories over Orient and West Bromwich Albion respectively.

15 April 1978: Leicester City's relegation is confirmed with a 4–1 defeat at home to Birmingham City. The Foxes go down with just four wins and 22 goals from their 39 matches so far this season.

17 April 1978: Newcastle United lose at Aston Villa and are relegated to the Second Division.

19 April 1978: A goal from Kevin Keegan gives England a 1–1 draw against Brazil at Wembley.

22 April 1978: Nottingham Forest seal the Football League First Division title, and become only the third club in history to do so a year after winning promotion. They get the point they need to guarantee the championship with four matches left from a goalless draw with Coventry City.

25 April 1978: Harry Griffiths, who recently stepped down as manager of Swansea City but was retained as assistant manager by his successor John Toshack, dies of heart attack aged 47 just before Swansea's 3-1 win over Scunthorpe United which moves them closer to promotion to the Third Division.

29 April 1978: West Ham United lose 2–0 at home to Liverpool, and can now only stay up on goal difference if Wolverhampton Wanderers lose their remaining two matches. Alex Stepney, the 35-year-old Manchester United goalkeeper, retires from playing. He spent the final 12 years of his playing career at Old Trafford, and at the time of his retirement he was the club's longest serving player and the last player remaining from their European Cup triumph of 1968. He also contributed to the League title triumph of 1967, relegation in 1974, promotion in 1975 and FA Cup glory in 1977.

2 May 1978: Wolverhampton Wanderers beat Aston Villa 3–1 to stay in the First Division at West Ham United's expense.

4 May 1978: Champions Nottingham Forest draw 0–0 with second-place Liverpool at Anfield to finish seven points clear at the top of the table. They are unbeaten in their last 26 League matches, a run stretching back to November, and have lost just three League games all season.

6 May 1978: Ipswich Town win the FA Cup for the first time in their history when a Roger Osborne goal gives them a 1–0 win over Arsenal at Wembley Stadium.

10 May 1978: Liverpool retain the European Cup thanks to a Kenny Dalglish goal against Club Brugge of Belgium at Wembley Stadium.

20 May 1978: Steve Coppell scores the only goal in England's 1–0 win over Scotland at Hampden Park. England win the Home Championship with a 100% record.

2 June 1978: Wigan Athletic, runners-up of the Northern Premier League, are elected to the Football League Fourth Division at the expense of Southport. Boston United, champions of the Northern Premier League, had been unable to apply for election to the Football League.

15 June 1978: Less than three months after Hartlepool United defender Dave Wiggett was killed in a car crash, another Football League club is plunged into mourning with the death of a player when Blackpool midfielder Alan Groves died of a heart attack aged 29.

National teams

UEFA Competitions

Liverpool thrashed Hamburg 6–0 to win the European Super Cup 7–1 on aggregate. In the Hamburg side was former Liverpool striker Kevin Keegan. They went on to beat Club Brugge 1–0 thanks to a Kenny Dalglish goal to retain the European Cup.

Manchester United were thrown out of the European Cup Winners' Cup on owing to the behaviour of their fans in the away leg of their tie against St. Étienne. They were reinstated a week later, but had to play the second leg at least 300 km from Manchester, at Plymouth Argyle's Home Park ground.

FA Cup

Bobby Robson led Ipswich Town to victory in the FA Cup, winning the final 1–0 against Arsenal.

Northern League side Blyth Spartans beat Second Division Stoke City 3–2 away to become the first non-League team to reach the fifth round of the FA Cup since 1949. They were seconds away from reaching the quarter-finals, but Wrexham equalised from a retaken corner kick before winning a replay.

League Cup

Nottingham Forest won the League Cup after victory over Liverpool in the replay.

Football League

First Division
Nottingham Forest won the First Division title with just three league defeats all season, one season after promotion. In doing so, their manager Brian Clough became only the second manager in English football to win the First Division title with different clubs. Clough's men also won the Football League Cup. It was the first time that Forest had won either trophy.

Liverpool finished runners-up in the league and retained the European Cup. Everton, Manchester City and Arsenal completed the top five. West Bromwich Albion finished sixth and sealed a UEFA Cup place, having continued to impress in the First Division following the mid-season resignation of Ronnie Allen as manager and the appointment of Ron Atkinson as his successor.

Manchester United broke the British transfer fee record on 9 February by paying Leeds United £495,000 for Scottish defender Gordon McQueen but finished a disappointing 10th, having sacked Tommy Docherty in the close season following the revelation of his affair with the wife of the club's physiotherapist. His replacement was former QPR boss Dave Sexton.

Leicester City and Newcastle United were bracketed together on 22 points after a terrible First Division campaign, Newcastle's relegation coming just one season after they had finished fifth in the league and qualified for the UEFA Cup. They were joined in the drop zone by West Ham United, the 1975 FA Cup winners, who kept faith in manager John Lyall and managed to hold on to key players Billy Bonds and Trevor Brooking.

Second Division
After narrowly missing out on promotion for the last two seasons, Bolton Wanderers finally ended their lengthy absence from the First Division by clinching the Second Division title. Southampton finished a point behind them in second place, ending their four-year absence from the First Division, during which they had won the FA Cup in 1976. Tottenham Hotspur clinched the final promotion place on goal difference, their advantage over fourth-placed Brighton being assisted by a 9-0 scoreline over Bristol Rovers in October 1977, during which striker Colin Lee had scored four goals on his club debut.

For much of the season it had been a four-horse race at the top of the Second Division, with fifth placed Blackburn Rovers finishing 11 points behind the leading pack.

Hull City were relegated to the third tier for the first time since 1966, after a campaign in which four different managers took charge of the team. Mansfield Town were relegated straight back to Division Three after a year, never looking like they would survive in their first-ever season at this level, though a late fightback after the appointment of veteran manager Billy Bingham at least saw them avoid last place. Blackpool were the final relegated side; they had been safely in mid-table for much of the campaign, but a disastrous end to the season combined with a host of other results going against them sent them down to the third tier for the first time ever. Despite the manner of their relegation, it wouldn't be until 2007 before they returned to this level.

Third Division
Wrexham won the Third Division title to clinch a place in the Second Division. They were joined by Cambridge United and Preston North End. Peterborough United, who had yet to progress beyond this level of the league, missed out on promotion on goal difference. Chester, another club with a similar track record in the league, finished two points short of the promotion places.

Portsmouth, the 1939 FA Cup winners and with two league titles to their name from the early postwar years, finished bottom of the Third Division to fall into the Fourth Division for the first time, and their very existence was also threatened by large debts. Hereford United, Bradford City and Port Vale also went down.

Fourth Division
Graham Taylor guided Watford to the Fourth Division title by an 11-point margin to repeat the promotion success he had achieved at Lincoln City two seasons earlier. Southend United finished second, while John Toshack kicked off his managerial career by taking Swansea City to promotion just weeks after being appointed. Brentford clinched the final promotion place, with Aldershot missing out on promotion by two points.

Wimbledon played their first season in the Football League, replacing Workington.

Southport, having finished second-from-bottom for the third season in succession, were voted out of the Football League and replaced by Wigan Athletic. This would ultimately prove the final occasion where a football club failed to earn re-election to the League, and the same 92 clubs would continue to make up its membership until 1987, by which point automatic promotion and relegation between the League and the Football Conference had been introduced.

Top goalscorers

First Division
Bob Latchford (Everton) – 30 goals

Second Division
Bob Hatton (Blackpool) – 22 goals

Third Division
Alex Bruce (Preston North End) – 27 goals

Fourth Division
Alan Curtis (Swansea City), Steve Phillips (Brentford) – 32 goals

Non-league football

Awards
Football Writers' Association
 FWA Footballer of the Year – Kenny Burns, Nottingham Forest

Professional Footballers' Association
 PFA Players' Player of the Year – Peter Shilton, Nottingham Forest
 PFA Young Player of the Year – Tony Woodcock, Nottingham Forest
 PFA Merit Award – Bill Shankly

Famous debutants

3 September 1977: Cyrille Regis, 19-year-old French Guiana born striker, makes his debut for West Bromwich Albion against Middlesbrough at The Hawthorns in the First Division, scoring in a 2–1 win.

3 September 1977: Russell Osman, 18-year-old defender, makes his debut for Ipswich Town in the 1–0 First Division win over Chelsea at Portman Road.

14 January 1978: Alan Brazil, 18-year-old Scottish striker, makes his debut for Ipswich Town as a substitute in the 2-1 First Division defeat by Manchester United at Portman Road.

28 January 1978: Craig Johnston, 17-year-old Australian midfielder, makes his debut for Middlesbrough in the 3-2 F.A Cup 4th Round win over Everton at Ayresome Park.

18 March 1978: Alvin Martin, 19-year-old defender, makes his debut as a substitute for West Ham United in the 4-1 First Division defeat by Aston Villa at Villa Park.

11 April 1978: Paul Goddard, 18-year-old striker, makes his debut as a substitute for Queen's Park Rangers in the 2-1 First Division win over Arsenal at Loftus Road.

15 April 1978: Terry Butcher, 19-year-old defender, makes his debut for Ipswich Town in the 1–0 First Division defeat by Everton at Goodison Park.

Deaths
 30 August 1977 - Alf Young, 71, played 283 league games in defence for Huddersfield Town between 1929 and 1939 and was capped nine times for England before his career was cut short by the war. After the war, he managed three Danish club sides and took charge of the Danish national side in 1956.
 23 October 1977 - Dick Crawshaw, 79, played 66 league at inside-forward for Manchester City, Halifax Town and Nelson between 1919 and 1924.
 29 November 1977 - Wilfred Milne, 78, spent his whole career as a full-back with Swansea between 1920 and 1937, making a club record 586 league appearances for the Swans. 
 27 December 1977 - James Marshall, 69, began his career with Rangers in his native Scotland in 1925 and scored 138 league goals before his transfer south of the border to Arsenal in 1934. However, he played just four league games for the Gunners before he moved to West Ham United the following year, scoring 14 goals in 59 league games before retiring in 1937. He was capped three times by Scotland.
 22 February 1978 - Jack Taylor, 64, played 201 league games as a full-back for Wolverhampton Wanderers, Norwich City and Hull City between 1931 and 1950, his career being disrupted by the war. He then managed non-league Weymouth before being appointed to QPR in 1952, serving at Loftus Road for seven years despite failing to win them promotion from the third tier of the English league. He was then recruited to Leeds United but they were relegated and he was dismissed in March 1961 to be succeeded by Don Revie.
 23 March 1978 – Dave Wiggett, 20, Hartlepool United defender who was killed in a car crash.
 4 April 1978 – Tony Leighton, 38, former Doncaster Rovers, Barnsley, Huddersfield Town and Bradford City striker, who died from motor neurone disease.
 25 April 1978 - Harry Griffiths, 47, who served Swansea for most of the last three decades of his life, was the club's assistant manager when he died of a heart attack during the game at Vetch Field in which they clinched promotion to the Third Division. He made 422 appearances in the league as a full-back between 1949 and 1964, scoring an impressive (for a defender) 72 goals. He returned to the club as coach in 1967 and was promoted to the manager's seat in 1975, becoming assistant manager weeks before his death on the appointment of John Toshack as player-manager.
 15 June 1978 – Alan Groves, 29, Blackpool midfielder who died as a result of a heart attack. He had previously played for five other clubs, most notably Oldham Athletic.

References

 Rothmans Football Yearbook 1978–79